Gymnobathra cenchrias is a moth of the family Oecophoridae. It was described by Edward Meyrick in 1909. It is found in New Zealand.

References

 Gymnobathra cenchrias in species-id

Moths described in 1909
Oecophoridae